Milou is a feminine given name that is derived from a combination of the names Marie and Louise. It is also the name of a dog in the comic strip The Adventures of Tintin. It is a currently popular name for girls in the Netherlands.

Notes